Montilliez is a municipality in the district of Gros-de-Vaud in the canton of Vaud in Switzerland.

The municipalities of Dommartin, Naz, Poliez-le-Grand and Sugnens merged on 1 July 2011 into the new municipality of Montilliez.

History
Dommartin is first mentioned in 908 as Domno Martino villa.  Naz is first mentioned around 1200  as Nars.  Poliez-le-Grand is first mentioned around 1160-79 as Poleto.  In 1225 it was mentioned as Pollie lo Grant.  Sugnens is first mentioned in 1177 as Sugnens.

Geography
Of this area,  or 67.2% is used for agricultural purposes, while  or 24.7% is forested. Of the rest of the land,  or 7.0% is settled (buildings or roads).

Transport
The municipality has a railway station, on the suburban Lausanne–Bercher line.

Historic Population
The historical population is given in the following chart:

References